American Union may refer to:

United States of America
American Union Against Militarism
North American Union
Union of South American Nations
Union (American Civil War)